Padmond Annor also known as Nana Mitch is a Ghanaian Snapchat lens creator, creative director, editor and content creator. He is known for his fashion and as the first Ghanaian Snapchat lens creator.

Early life and education
Nana Mitch was born in Sefwi Wiaso and has a twin brother called Padmond Annor Jr. He attended Grace Preparatory School and later moved on to Great Faith Preparatory School in Santasi Anyinam, Kumasi for his primary education. He further went to complete his Junior High School at Better Best Academy in Tema.

Nana attended Ofori Panin Senior High School for his senior high school education in which he graduated in 2016 and later went on to study at the National Film and Television Institute, and was awarded a BFA in film editing.

Career
Nana Mitch started to create Snapchat lenses in December 2015 when he noticed a gap on the platform about Ghanaian lenses and culture. During the COVID-19 pandemic he signed up for a virtual lens studio class which helped him gain more knowledge on snapchat lens creations. He also co-foundered Schardo TV and productions with his twin brother Padmond Annor Jr. Nana Mitch and his twin brother have been creating content around various topics in Ghana and during the 65th independence of Ghana they did content celebrating it.

Among his most notable creation is the ‘’4 More For Nana’’ lens he designed for the President of the Republic of Ghana, Nana Akufo-Addo and modelling for Don Jazzy’s ‘’Jazzy Burger’’.

Nana Mitch has created custom Snapchat lenses for the following African entertainment personalities namely Bobrisky, Eniola Badmus, Sister Derby, Zlatan (musician) and Hajia4Real.

Ambassadorial deals
Nana Mitch is also a social media influencer who has had brand ambassador deals with the following Ghanaian and Nigerian brands Pizzaman Chickenman, SMS Properties, Ridge Condos, Jays Finder and Kolaq Alagbo.

Notable mentions
Nana Mitch was named among the Keep Walking Top 30 list of African creatives by Johnnie Walker and Trace TV as Africa's Next-Gen Cultural Shape Shifters.

Awards and nominations

References

External links
 Instagram
 TikTok

Living people
Ghanaian internet celebrities
TikTokers
Year of birth missing (living people)